Tangier Combined School is a K-12 public school in Tangier, Virginia. A part of Accomack County Public Schools, it is the sole comprehensive K-12 public school in the State of Virginia.

The current campus opened circa 1998. The previous campus was across the street.

In 1999 it had about 120 students.   it had 60 students.

The majority of students go to school on foot or by bicycle, golf cart, or scooter; the island is not accessible by car.

References

External links
 Tangier Combined School

Public elementary schools in Virginia
Public middle schools in Virginia
Public high schools in Virginia
Schools in Accomack County, Virginia